Valerie Paul Hart (March 13, 1933February 26, 2021) was an indigenous political leader from the Wapishana ethnic group and a member of Guyana's Amerindian Party, opposed to the Forbes Burnham government; she ran for the 1968 general elections, although she wasn't elected. She was exiled after participating in the Rupununi uprising.

Personal life
Valerie got her last name from her husband (Harry Hart) who was a pilot with whom she had five children. Both Valerie and her husband participated in the celebrations of the Independence of Guyana in 1966 in an aerobatic display.

Separatist movement

Being a member of Guyana's Amerindian Party along with her husband's family, she was present at the First Conference of Amerindians Leaders, named the Cabacaburi Congress, that presented several demands to the Prime Minister Forbes Burnham representing the community of around 40,000 indigenous people of the region.

In the 1968 Guyanese general election, Hart ran for a seat in the National Assembly of Guyana under The United Force party.

On the morning of 2 January 1969, there was a peasant uprising against the authorities of the district and took public buildings, airports, and hostages. Valerie was named First President of the Essequibo Free State that immediately requested the Venezuelan protection of the Raúl Leoni government. That night, the rebellion was violently suppressed by Guyanese Defense Forces, resulting in the destruction of several indigenous homes, around 100 fatalities and the escape of many indigenous to Brasil and Venezuela.

Exile
That same night, Valerie Hart fled with her family to Ciudad Bolívar, before going to Caracas to request military aid from the Venezuelan government; according to her, her goal was, on behalf of the rebels, to create an independent region of Guyana.

From the interviews conducted with the Venezuelan Foreign and Interior ministers, she said that they had not made any offer, since they told her that they were very sensitive international political issues. Minutes after, questioned by journalists after leaving his office, the Minister declared that "Venezuela is not considering aiding the Guyana rebels". Interior Affairs Minister Reinaldo Leandro Mora declared that "the movement would not have failed if Venezuela had intervened". In a press conference nearby, in the Antímano Lounge of El Conde hotel, Valerie Hart declared indignate that: "I want it to be well understood that if the Venezuelan government, by pressure of the United States, does not lend any help to the Rupununi people, it would be equal to support the Burnham government".

Hart became an Evangelical Christian later in life. She died in Vero Beach, Florida, on 26 February 2021.

References 

1934 births
Indigenous leaders of the Americas
Living people
Guyanese expatriates in the United States
People from Upper Takutu-Upper Essequibo
20th-century Guyanese politicians
20th-century women politicians
Guyanese women in politics